The Chinese Immigration Act, 1923, also known as the "Chinese Exclusion Act" (the duration of which has been dubbed the Exclusion Era), was a Canadian Act of Parliament passed by the government of Liberal Prime Minister William Lyon Mackenzie King, banning most forms of Chinese immigration to Canada. Immigration from most countries was controlled or restricted in some way, but only the Chinese were completely prohibited from immigrating to Canada.

History
Before 1923, Chinese immigration was heavily controlled by the Chinese Immigration Act of 1885, which imposed an onerous head tax on all immigrants from China. 

After various members of the federal and some provincial governments (especially British Columbia) put pressure on the federal government to discourage Chinese immigration, the Chinese Immigration Act was passed. It went into effect on 1 July 1923. The Act banned Chinese immigrants from entering Canada except those under the following titles:

 Diplomat
 Foreign student
 "Special circumstance" granted by the Minister of Immigration under Article 9 of the Act (This is the class that former Governor General Adrienne Clarkson's family fell under.)
 Merchant

The Act did not only apply to Chinese from China but ethnic Chinese with British nationality as well. Since Dominion Day coincided with the enforcement of the Chinese Immigration Act, Chinese-Canadians at the time referred to the anniversary of Confederation as "Humiliation Day" and refused to take any part in the celebration.

Because Canada became a signatory following World War II of the United Nations' Charter of Human Rights, with which the Chinese Immigration Act was inconsistent, the Canadian Parliament repealed the act on 14 May 1947 (following the proclamation of the Canadian Citizenship Act, 1946 on 1 January 1947). However, independent Chinese immigration to Canada came only after the liberalization of Canadian immigration policy under the governments of John Diefenbaker and Lester Pearson, first by the elimination of restrictions based on national origins in 1962, followed by the establishment of the world's first points-based immigration system in 1967.

Redress and legacy
On 22 June 2006, then-Prime Minister Stephen Harper apologized in the House of Commons. The first phrase of the apology was spoken in Cantonese Chinese, despite the overwhelming number of affected Chinese who are versed in the Taishanese dialect.

On 15 May 2014, then-Premier of British Columbia Christy Clark apologized in the Legislative Assembly. The apology motion was unanimously passed and aims to make amends for historic wrongs. Unlike the federal apology, no individual compensation was provided. However,  was promised to be put into a legacy fund which would help legacy initiatives. The formal apology went through a three-month consultation period with various parties to help ensure that the apology was done properly.

On 22 April 2018, then-Mayor of Vancouver, British Columbia Gregor Robertson issued a formal public apology.

The Act and its legacy have been the subject of an acclaimed documentary film and work of historical fiction:

 Lost Years: A People's Struggle for Justice (2011) by Kenda Gee and Tom Radford
 The Red Tiger (2019) by Chuck Lim

See also
 Chinese Exclusion Act
 Chinese head tax
 Immigration to Canada
 White Australia policy
 New Zealand head tax

References

External links

1923 in Canadian law
1923 in international relations
Anti-Chinese activities in Canada
Anti-Chinese legislation
Canadian federal legislation
Canadian immigration law
History of Chinese Canadians
History of immigration to Canada
History of Vancouver
Immigration legislation
Legal history of Canada
Repealed Canadian legislation
Chinese-Canadian culture in Vancouver
Immigration bans